Anophthalmoonops is a monotypic genus of spiders in the family Oonopidae. It was first described by Benoit in 1976. , it contains only one species, Anophthalmoonops thoracotermitis found in Angola.

References

Endemic fauna of Angola
Oonopidae
Monotypic Araneomorphae genera
Spiders of Africa